Elections to Wigan council were held on Thursday, 2 May 1996, with an extra vacancy in Abram to be filled. Going into the election there were noticeably fewer candidates than usual, with the total candidate number and the five uncontested wards only narrowly lower than the all-time lows set at the 1990 election. This was mainly caused by the lack of any minor party candidates, and the Liberal Democrat slate dropping by half upon the previous election, to seven - their scarcest outing since their lowest ebb throughout their merger in 1990, but more reminiscent of their patchy participation of the seventies. Turnout had been consistently poor in recent elections, and this election continued the downward trend, dropping below a quarter of the electorate for the second time (the first being the all-time low set in 1992) to 24.2%.

Labour once again surpassed their vote share high, this time recording a zenith of over three-quarters of votes cast, but simultaneously attained their third lowest vote figure in history (1975 and 1992 being lower). The Conservatives managed to increase modestly upon their rock-bottom standing of the previous year, but on accumulated votes they failed to surpass anything other than their nadir. The Lib Dems figure reflected their seventies-style participation, with their vote share reduced to single figures for the first since 1980, and their lowest vote figure since 1978.

Following Labour's overwhelming victories scored in recent years, both the Liberal Democrats and the Conservatives were looking at a wipe-out, or near that for the Lib Dems, if they couldn't vastly improve upon recent performances. The Conservatives, long confined to the ward of Swinley, failed to improve their vote meaningfully and were handily defeated, ending their 23-year representation on the council. The Lib Dems were facing a similarly arduous task, and in their former-bastion of Langtree actually suffered a swing away from them. However, they managed a sizeable swing of 14.4% in Beech Hill to hold on to their second seat in the council by a mere 34 vote majority. This left Labour with the largest majority since the council's creation of 66.

Election result

This result had the following consequences for the total number of seats on the Council after the elections:

Ward results

By-elections between 1996 and 1998

References

1996 English local elections
1996
1990s in Greater Manchester